François-Louis-Edme-Gabriel, Comte du Maitz de Goimpy Feuquières  was a French Navy officer.

Career 
Goimpy joined the Navy as a Garde-Marine in 1746. He was promoted to Lieutenant in 1757, to Captain in 1772. 

He fought in the Battle of Martinique (1780), and commanded the 74 gun Destin at the 1781 Battle of the Chesapeake. He was also an active lecturer at the Académie de Marine. 

In 1782, he was promoted to Brigadier, and to Chef d'escadre in 1784.

Citations and references 
Citations

References
 
 

French Navy officers
18th-century French people